Waramaug succeeded Squantz in 1725 as sachem of the Potatuck Native American tribe, folded into the current Schaghticoke tribe, who lived along the length of the Housatonic River, until his death in 1735. He was succeeded as sachemship of the Potatuck after his death by one of Chief Squantz's sons, Mauwehu.

According to Tomaino citing Smith, he ruled in a time when the Wepawaugs, Pequannocks, Paugassetts, and Pootatucks were reblending into a single tribe.

According to Tomaino citing Orcutt, "That Waramaug was 'the most potent prince of that or any other day in this colony,' is probably a very correct judgment, and would have been demonstrated had there been any occasion for Indian Wars, since he could have called into the field all the warriors of Western Connecticut."

A monument to Waramaug was erected after his death in 1735, near the gorge to the northeast of Falls Mountain.

Lake Waramaug is named after him. 

An alternative name of "Wehanonaug" is given in Tomaino.

Additional references

References

18th-century Native Americans
Native Americans in Connecticut
Schaghticoke tribe
Native American leaders
Year of birth unknown